Airs on a Shoestring was a British musical revue, first staged at the Royal Court Theatre in London on 22 April 1953.

The show, described as "an intimate revue", was devised and directed by Laurier Lister.  Cast members included Max Adrian, Madeleine Dring, Moyra Fraser, Betty Marsden, and Denis Quilley. Musical numbers included material by Michael Flanders and Donald Swann.

The show toured until March 1955, achieving a run of 772 performances.

References

1953 musicals
Revues
British musicals